Baby(a)lone is a 2015 Luxembourgian drama film directed by Donato Rotunno. It was selected as the Luxembourgian entry for the Best Foreign Language Film at the 88th Academy Awards but it was not nominated.

Cast
 Joshua Defays as X
 Charlotte Elsen as Shirley
 Etienne Halsdorf as Johnny
 Gintare Parulyte as Nathalie
 Fabienne Elaine Hollwege as Sandra

See also
 List of submissions to the 88th Academy Awards for Best Foreign Language Film
 List of Luxembourgish submissions for the Academy Award for Best Foreign Language Film

References

External links
 
 
 Baby(a)lone profile at Cineuropa

2015 films
2015 drama films
Belgian drama films
Luxembourgian drama films
Luxembourgish-language films